George W. Scott may refer to:

George W. Scott (American football), American football and track and field coach
George W. Scott (politician) (born 1937), American politician in the state of Washington
George Washington Scott (1829–1903), industrialist and philanthropist, benefactor of Agnes Scott College